Timandra is a genus of moths in the family Geometridae first described by Philogène Auguste Joseph Duponchel in 1829.

Taxonomy
Timandra was raised by Duponchel and is taken from Greek mythology and is named after the daughter of Tyndareus and Leda.

Description
Palpi not reaching beyond the frons. Antennae of male bipectinate (comb like on both sides). Apex simple. Hind tibia of male with two spur pairs. Forewings with acute and produced apex. Vein 3 from near angle of cell and vein 5 from somewhat above middle of discocellulars. Veins 7, 8 and 9 stalked. Vein 10 anastomosing (fusing) with veins 8 and 9 to form the areole. Hindwings with produced outer margin to a point at vein 4, veins 6 and 7 from angle of cell.

Species

 Timandra amaturaria Walker, 1866
 Timandra apicirosea (Prout, 1935)
 Timandra comae Schmidt, 1931
 Timandra commixta Warren, 1895
 Timandra comptaria (Walker, 1863)
 Timandra convectaria Walker, 1861
 Timandra dichela (Prout, 1935)
 Timandra extremaria Walker, 1861
 Timandra griseata Petersen, 1902
 Timandra paralias (Prout, 1935)
 Timandra recompta (Prout, 1930)
 Timandra rectistrigaria (Eversmann, 1851)
 Timandra synthaca (Prout, 1938)

Gallery of caterpillars of T. amaturaria

References

 
 

Timandrini
Taxa named by Philogène Auguste Joseph Duponchel